Artur is a cognate to the common male given name Arthur, meaning "bear-like," which is believed to possibly be descended from the Roman surname Artorius or the Celtic bear-goddess Artio or more probably from the Celtic word artos ("bear"). Other Celtic languages have similar first names, such as Old Irish Art, Artúur,  Welsh Arth - which may also be the source for the modern name.
Art is also a diminutive form of the common name Arthur. In Estonian, and many Romance, Slavic and Germanic languages the name is spelled as Artur. The Finnish versions are Arttu and Artturi.

Avestan /arta and its Vedic equivalent  both derive from Proto-Indo-Iranian *ṛtá- "truth", which in turn continues Proto-Indo-European * "properly joined, right, true", from the root *.

People
Artur Adson (1889–1977), Estonian author
Artur Alliksaar (1923–1966), Estonian poet
Artur Axmann (1913–1996), German Nazi leader
Artur Beterbiev (born 1985), Chechen boxer 
Artur Sérgio Batista de Souza (born 1994), Brazilian footballer
Artur Boruc (born 1980), Polish footballer
Artur Chilingarov (born 1939), Russian explorer and politician
Artur Davis (born 1967), American attorney and politician
Artur Fischer (1919–2016), German inventor
Artur Fonte (born 1959), Portuguese footballer known as Artur
Artur Jorge, various people
Artur Kapp (1878–1952), Estonian composer
Artur Kasterpalu (189–1942), Estonian politician
Artur Khachaturyan (born 1992), Armenian basketball player
Artur Konontšuk (born 2000), Estonian basketball player
Artur Kotenko (born 1981), Estonian footballer
Artur Lemba (1885–1963), Estonian composer
Artur Lind (1927–1989), Estonian biologist
Artur Lohai (born 1993), Ukrainian actor and singer, participant of Ukrainian X-Factor version in 2014
Artur London (1915–1986), Czechoslovak politician
Artur Mägi (1904-1981), Estonian legal scientist 
Artur Mas (born 1956), Catalan politician
Artur Meliashkevich (born 1975), Belarusian race walker
Artur Moraes (born 1981), Brazilian footballer
Artur Phleps (1881–1944) Romanian-German military commander
Artur Pikk (born 1993), Estonian footballer
Artur Pinga (1909–1963), Portuguese footballer and coach
Artur Quaresma (1917–2011), Portuguese footballer
Artur Rasizade (born 1935), former Prime Minister of Azerbaijan
Artur Rinne (1910–1984), Estonian singer and director 
Artur Sanhá (born 1965), Guinea-Bissauan politician
Artur Schnabel (1882–1951), Austrian pianist
Artur da Costa e Silva (1902–1969), Brazilian politician
Artur Sirk (1900–1937), Estonian politician and military commander
Artur (footballer, born 1955) (born 1955), Portuguese footballer
Artur Soares Dias (born 1979), Portuguese football referee
Artur Talvik (born 1964), Estonian filmmaker and politician
Artur Terras (1901–1963), Estonian politician, former mayor of Tallinn (1941–1944)
Artur Toom (1884–1942), Estonian ornithologist and conservationist
Artur Uritamm (1901–1982), Estonian classical composer, organist and pedagogue
Artur Văitoianu (1864–1956), Romanian politician and military commander
Artur (footballer, born 1984), José Artur Barbosa de Oliveira, Brazilian right back
Artur (footballer, born 1990) (born 1990), Brazilian footballer
Artur (footballer, born 1996) (born 1996), Brazilian footballer
Artur (footballer, born 1998) (born 1998), Brazilian footballer

Legendary people
King Arthur, medieval British legendary king

References

Czech masculine given names
German masculine given names
Estonian masculine given names
Portuguese masculine given names
Romanian masculine given names
Scottish Gaelic masculine given names